The Firs may refer to:

Chancellors Hotel & Conference Centre (formerly named The Firs), a Grade II listed mansion in Fallowfield, Manchester, England
The Firs, a farm near Lower Quinton, Warwickshire, England, scene of the 1945 murder of Charles Walton
The Firs, name used by the National Trust for the Elgar Birthplace Museum, Worcestershire, England
The Firs, Adelaide, South Australia, an historic home in Hutt Street, now known as Rymill House
The Firs, Whitchurch, a house once referred to as "Winston Churchill's toyshop"
The Firs Estate, a housing estate in Bromford, Birmingham, built in the 1950s
Firs Estate School, Derby, a primary school in Derby, England
The Firs Stadium, former speedway stadium in Norwich, England

See also
FIR (disambiguation)
FIRS (disambiguation)